The Santa Fe impact structure is an eroded remnant of a bolide impact crater in the Sangre de Cristo Mountains northeast of Santa Fe, New Mexico. The discovery was made in 2005 by a geologist who noticed shatter cones in the rocks in a decades-old road cut on New Mexico State Road 475 between Santa Fe and Hyde Memorial State Park. Shatter cones are a definitive indicator that the rocks had been exposed to a shock of pressures only possible in a meteor impact or a nuclear explosion.

It is called an "impact structure" and not a crater because it is so deeply eroded. Current estimates place the age of the impact between 1.4 and 1.6 billion years. Only the crater's basement rocks remain on the surface in the mountains today. The shatter cones occur for about 1 mile (1.6 km) along the highway, which is interpreted to coincide with a central area within a crater of greater diameter.

References

Impact craters of the United States
Landforms of New Mexico
Landforms of Santa Fe County, New Mexico